Young Man Running is the fourth album by Corey Hart, released in 1988. It charted in the U.S., reaching #126, and generated the hit single, "In Your Soul", which reached #38.

Track listing 
All songs written by Corey Hart.

"Don't Take Me to the Racetrack" - 3:40
"In Your Soul" - 3:57
"Truth Will Set You Free" - 4:21
"Chase the Sun" - 3:18
"So It Goes..." - 3:48
"Still in Love" - 3:41
"Spot You in a Coalmine" (with Ruby Turner) - 4:50
"Lone Wolf" - 3:41
"No Love Lost" - 4:02
"Crossroad Caravan" - 2:43
"Chippin' Away" - 3:40
"21" (bonus track for Japanese release only)

Personnel 
 Corey Hart – lead vocals, keyboards, acoustic piano, backing vocals (1-7, 9, 10)
 Andy Richards – keyboards, Fairlight Series III programming
 Ray Coburn – additional keyboards 
 Michael Hehir – electric guitars, acoustic guitars, dobro, mandolin, harmonica
 Russell Boswell – bass 
 Greg Haver – drums 
 Mel Collins – saxophones 
 Andy Hamilton – saxophones 
 Ruby Turner – backing vocals, lead vocals (7)
 Matt D'Arbanlay-Butler – leading thespian (5)
 Escolania de Montserrat – choir (8)
 The "Good 'Ole Boys" – backing vocals (11)

Production 
 Corey Hart – producer 
 Andy Richards – producer (1, 2, 4, 5, 8, 9)
 Bruce Brault – executive producer 
 Matt D'Arbanlay-Butler – engineer, recording, mixing 
 Richard Edwards – assistant engineer 
 Matt Howe – assistant engineer 
 Paul Rushbrooke – technical assistant 
 Rich Travali – technical assistant 
 Bob Ludwig – mastering 
 Erika Gargon – design, additional photography 
 Herb Ritts – photography
 Rebecca Blake – additional photography 
 Freddy Demann – management 

Studios
 Track 1 recorded at Sarm West Studios (London, UK).
 Tracks 2-11 recorded at AIR Studios (Montserrat).
 Mastered at Masterdisk (New York City, New York, USA).

Certifications

References

1988 albums
Corey Hart (singer) albums
Manhattan Records albums